The Beat 99.9 FM is a Lagos based English-language radio station centered on music, information and the Nigerian entertainment industry. The station started broadcasting on July 1, 2003. It also produces Beat TV, a YouTube channel. It was the first African radio station to get verified on Twitter.

A similar station, The Beat 97.9 FM, operates in Abuja.

Notable presenters

Current
 Maria Okanrende
 Toolz

Former
 Dami Elebe

References

External links
Official website

Radio stations in Lagos
Radio stations established in 2009
2009 establishments in Nigeria